Endeka Kozanis is a traditional Greek dance, mostly danced at the region of Kozani. According to one point of view, it is a dance that was being danced at the weddings ("nyfiatikos" as said in Greek). 

The dance is believed to have been invented by the Turks, and it originated in Kozani.

References 

Kozani
Greek dances